The Al-Hamidiyah Souq is the largest and the central souk in Syria, located inside the old walled city of Damascus next to the Citadel. The souq starts at Al-Thawra street and ends at the Umayyad Mosque plaza, and the ancient Roman Temple of Jupiter stands 40 feet tall in its entrance.

History

The souq dates back to the Ottoman era and was built along the axis of the Roman route to the Temple of Jupiter around 1780 during the reign of Sultan Abdul Hamid I, and later extended during the reign of Sultan Abdul Hamid II. Nowadays it is one of the most popular shopping districts in Syria, being lined with hundreds of clothes emporiums, shops selling traditional crafts and jewelry, cafés, grocery stores, food stalls and ice cream parlors. Before the ongoing Syrian Civil War it was one of Damascus's main attractions and was visited by many foreigners, including Europeans and Gulf Arabs; however it still remains a popular attraction for locals and Syrians.

Although there have been many violent clashes around Damascus and in some of its districts the souq has not been affected in any way by the ongoing war, but peaceful protests and demonstrations have taken place in the nearby Medhat Pasha Souq, which extends from the Al Hamidiyah Souq.

It was one of the treasures featured in the 2005 BBC documentary Around the World in 80 Treasures presented by Dan Cruickshank.

See also

 Al-Buzuriyah Souq
 Medhat Pasha Souq
 Al-Madina Souq of Aleppo

References

Hamidiyah